Vic Gerami is an Armenian-American journalist, LGBT activist, and columnist based in Los Angeles, California. He is the host and producer of the radio show The Blunt Post with Vic and the editor and publisher of The Blunt Post.

Career 
A noted columnist, Gerami is a journalist and media contributor who is also publisher and editor of The Blunt Post.

He spent six years at Frontiers, followed by LA Weekly and Voice Media Group. His syndicated celebrity Questions & Answer column, 10 Questions with Vic, was a finalist for LA Press Club's National Arts & Entertainment Journalism Award in 2017.

Gerami is also the host and producer of his show, The Blunt Post with Vic on Public Radio KPFK 90.7 FM 90.7 FM.

Today reaching national international audiences, Gerami first built a foundation of knowledge and skills by learning the media industry during his years at Frontiers Magazine, followed by positions at LA Weekly and Voice Media Group. For the second time, Gerami was selected as a finalist in the Los Angeles Press Club’s National Arts and Entertainment Journalism Awards “Columnist of the Year” category in 2019, having first made the final round of consideration in 2017. His celebrity Q&A column, ‘10 Questions with Vic‘ is internationally syndicated.

Gerami is a contributor to the LGBTQ San Diego County News, Windy City Times, Houston Voice, DC Life Magazine, Out & About Nashville, Q Virginia, GNI MAG, QNotes, GoWeHo, Asbarez, The California Courier, Desert Daily Guide, Armenian Weekly, GED, The Pride LA, IN Magazine, Out Traveler, The Fight Magazine and The Advocate Magazine, among others.

He wrote and directed the 2022 documentary Motherland on the 2020 Nagorno-Karabakh war.

Recognition 
In 2009, Gerami was noted in The Wall Street Journal as a "leading gay activist in West Hollywood" opposed Prop 8 and advocate for marriage equality and the Los Angeles Blade. He was on the planning committee of Resist March 2017 and is a founding board member of Equality Armenia.

Gerami is a member of the team at You Matter-Not Alone, a charitable organization dedicated to suicide prevention and suicide awareness.

See also
 LGBT rights in Armenia
 Recognition of same-sex unions in Armenia

References

External links
 
 

Journalists from California
American male journalists
American LGBT rights activists
Living people
American LGBT journalists
Year of birth missing (living people)
American people of Armenian descent